History from Below is the follow-up album to 2008's critically acclaimed Ode to Sunshine by San Diego's Delta Spirit. The album was released on June 8, 2010.

The band began streaming "White Table" on its website on May 6.

"Devil Knows You're Dead" was featured in the series finale of Friday Night Lights on July 15, 2011, and "Salt in the Wound" was featured on the television show Grey's Anatomy.

Track listing 

 "9/11" – 3:16
 "Bushwick Blues" – 3:42
 "Salt in the Wound" – 5:51
 "White Table" – 5:07
 "Ransom Man" – 4:28
 "Devil Knows You’re Dead" – 3:58
 "Golden State" – 3:16
 "Scarecrow" – 4:07
 "Vivian" – 4:29
 "St. Francis" – 4:23
 "Ballad of Vitaly" – 8:05

The last song on the album, "Ballad of Vitaly," was inspired by the story of Vitaly Kaloyev.

Personnel
Matthew Vasquez – lead vocals, guitars, drums, keyboards, percussion, harmonica
Kelly Winrich – vocals, keyboards, guitars, drums, percussion, dronebox, horn arrangements
Jonathan Jameson – vocals, bass guitar, drums, percussion
Brandon Young – vocals, drums, percussion

Additional musicians:
Bo Koster – additional keyboards, percussion
Elijah Thomson – vocals
Carl Broemel – pedal steel on Devil Knows You're Dead
Blake Mills – guitar on Devil Knows You're Dead
Brett Wagner – horn section on St. Francis
Additional horn arrangements on St. Francis by Brett Wagner

References

Delta Spirit albums
2010 albums
Rounder Records albums